Todd D. Stern (born May 4, 1951) was the United States Special Envoy for Climate Change, and was the United States' chief negotiator at the 2015 Paris Climate Agreement.

Education
Stern graduated from Dartmouth College in 1973, and earned a J.D. at Harvard Law School.

Career 
Stern served as the United States Special Envoy for Climate Change, leading talks at the United Nations climate change conferences and smaller sessions, appointed by U.S. Secretary of State Hillary Clinton on January 26, 2009. He was the United States' chief negotiator at the 2015 Paris Climate Agreement.

Stern has proposed the creation of the E-8, a novel international group uniting leading developed nations and developing ones for an annual gathering focused on combating global warming.

Stern previously served under the Bill Clinton administration as Assistant to the President and Staff Secretary in the White House from 1993 to 1998, during which time he also acted as the senior White House negotiator at the Kyoto Protocol and Buenos Aires negotiations.

At the 2011 United Nations Climate Change Conference (COP-17) in Durban, Stern was interrupted by Abigail Borah, who accused USA of moving to slowly to tackle climate change.

Family life 
On 10 September 1995, at the Brooklyn Botanic Garden, Stern married Jennifer Lynn Klein, a policy analyst working for the Domestic Policy Council and office of the First Lady.

See also 
 Initiative on Global Climate Change

References

External links

“The only sustainable development is low carbon development,” Todd Stern says (Video, 2009)
State Dept.: Official bio

|-

1951 births
20th-century American Jews
Dartmouth College alumni
Harvard Law School alumni
Illinois Democrats
Living people 
People from Chicago
Sustainability advocates
United States Special Envoys
White House Staff Secretaries
21st-century American Jews